Edson Ulises Rivera Vargas (born 4 November 1991) is a Mexican professional footballer who plays as a midfielder for Tepatitlán.

Early life
Edson began playing football at age 6. He has been playing for the youth systems of Club Atlas for seven years.

Club career

Atlas
Rivera began playing with Atlas' lower division team in Tepic, Nayarit in the 2004–05 season. He has played for their youth system for about 7 seasons and has yet to debut with their First Division. He had a stint with Atlas' other team Académicos de Guadalajara in the 2008–09 season.

Braga
After his participation in Mexico's U20 World Cup campaign where they would finish third place, and where he finished as their top scorer with three goals, Rivera signed a five-year contract with Braga of the Portuguese Primeira Liga for an undisclosed fee.

Rivera was handed a start by Braga boss Leonardo Jardim in a 2–1 win at Beira-Mar in a league match.

Return to Atlas
On November 16, 2012, Rivera was presented as the first signing of Atlas for the Clausura 2013 tournament. He scored his first goal of the season on February 9, 2013, against Atlante F.C., in which he dedicated it to his mother, who died that same week.

International career
Rivera has been involved with the Mexico under-20 national team. He competed in tournaments such as the 2011 Toulon Tournament in France. He was also Mexico's top scorer in the 2011 FIFA U-20 World Cup.

Honours
Santos Laguna
Liga MX: Clausura 2015
Campeón de Campeones: 2015

Tepatitlán
Liga de Expansión MX: Guardianes 2021
Campeón de Campeones: 2021

Mexico U20
CONCACAF Under-20 Championship: 2011

References

External links
 
 
 

1991 births
Living people
Footballers from Guadalajara, Jalisco
Mexico under-20 international footballers
Mexican expatriate footballers
Mexican footballers
Primeira Liga players
Liga MX players
S.C. Braga players
S.C. Braga B players
Atlas F.C. footballers
Santos Laguna footballers
Expatriate footballers in Portugal
Mexican expatriate sportspeople in Portugal
Association football forwards